The 2006 New England Grand Prix was the fourth race for the 2006 American Le Mans Series season at Lime Rock Park.  It took place on July 1, 2006.

This race was marked by the final running of the Audi R8 in competitive motorsports.  The car carried a special paintjob dedicated to its multiple ALMS championships, multiple 24 Hours of Le Mans wins, and the names of every driver to run an Audi R8, as well as every track that the Audi R8 won at.  The R8 was replaced by the new Audi R10 TDI for the next race in Utah.

Official results

Class winners in bold.  Cars failing to complete 70% of winner's distance marked as Not Classified (NC).

Statistics
 Pole Position - #7 Penske Racing - 0:45.588
 Fastest Lap - #7 Penske Racing - 0:47.074
 Distance - 
 Average Speed -

External links
 

N
Northeast Grand Prix
2006 in sports in Connecticut